Paolo Macchiarini (born 22 August 1958) is a Swiss-born Italian thoracic surgeon and former regenerative medicine researcher who became known for research fraud and manipulative behavior. He has been convicted of research-related crimes in Italy and Sweden.

Previously considered a pioneer for using both biological and synthetic scaffolds seeded with patients' own stem cells as trachea transplants, Macchiarini was a Visiting Professor and Director on a temporary contract at Sweden's Karolinska Institutet (KI) from 2010. Macchiarini has been accused of unethically performing experimental surgeries, even on relatively healthy patients, resulting in fatalities for seven of the eight patients who received one of his synthetic trachea transplants. Articles in Vanity Fair and Aftonbladet further suggested that he had falsified some of his academic credentials on résumés.

, the secretary of the Nobel Committee for Physiology or Medicine, resigned in February 2016, owing to his involvement in recruiting Macchiarini to KI.
Shortly afterwards KI's vice chancellor, who in 2015 had cleared Macchiarini of misconduct, also resigned. KI terminated its clinical relationship with Macchiarini in 2013 but allowed him to continue as a researcher; in February 2016, the university announced that it would not renew his research contract, which was due to expire in November, and terminated the contract the following month. After being dismissed from KI, Macchiarini worked at the Kazan Federal University in Russia until that institution terminated his project in April 2017, effectively firing him.

After a one-year medico-legal investigation, the Swedish Prosecution Authority announced in October 2017 that Macchiarini had been negligent in four of the five cases investigated due to the use of devices and procedures not supported by evidence, but that a crime could not be proven because the patients might have died under any other treatment given. Also in October, Sweden's Expert Group on Scientific Misconduct found evidence of research fraud by Macchiarini and his co-authors in six papers and called for them to be retracted. As of 2023, Macchiarini has had eight of his research papers retracted, and four others have received an expression of concern.

Education and career 
Macchiarini obtained his medical degree (equivalent to MD) at the Medical School of the University of Pisa (UniPi) in 1986 and a Master of Surgery in 1991. He was an assistant professor at UniPi from 1990 to 1992. He took a course on statistics in clinical research at University of Alabama at Birmingham in 1989. Macchiarini obtained degree certificates—a masters in organ and tissue transplantation dated 1994 and a doctorate in the same dated 1997—from University of Franche-Comté in France. According to Germany's Hannover Medical School, he never had a salaried position there, but was head of the department of thoracic and vascular surgery at the Heidehaus Hanover hospital between 1999 and 2004. Macchiarini was an investigator at the Institut d'Investigacions Biomèdiques-Instituto de Investigaciones Biomédicas in Barcelona, Spain, from 2006 to 2009; he was affiliated with but not an employee of the University of Barcelona and was apparently an employee at the Hospital Clínic de Barcelona during this time. He had an honorary appointment as a Visiting Professor from 2009 to 2014, at University College London. He was a consultant and project manager at University Hospital Careggi (AOUC) starting in 2010.

Later in 2010, Macchiarini was appointed as a visiting professor at the Karolinska Institute (KI) in Stockholm and as a part-time position as surgeon at the affiliated university hospital. In 2013, KI terminated its clinical relationship with Macchiarini but allowed him to continue as a researcher; in February 2016, the university announced that it would not renew Macchiarini's research contract, which was due to expire in November, and terminated the contract the following month. KI published the incomplete results of its verification of Macchiarini's CV in February 2016.

Macchiarini made ties in Russia after he gave a master class in 2010, at the invitation of politician Mikhail Batin; a few months later he did a trachea transplant there which was widely covered in Russian media. This led to Macchiarini's 2011 appointment at Kuban State Medical University, funded by the university and the Russian government, along with an honorary doctorate. In 2016, he moved to Kazan Federal University and the grant money moved with him. In April 2017, the university terminated Macchiarini's research project there.

Notable trachea surgeries

Claudia Castillo 
In June 2008, Macchiarini conducted a transplant of a donated trachea colonized with the stem cells of the recipient, Claudia Castillo; the tissue was used to replace her left bronchus, which had been damaged by tuberculosis, and her left lung had collapsed. The trachea came from a cadaver, and was stripped of its cells and seeded with cells taken from Castillo's bone marrow. The bone marrow cells were cultured at the University of Bristol, the donor trachea was stripped at University of Padua, the stripped trachea was seeded with the cultured cells at University of Milan, and the trachea was transplanted by a team led by Macchiarini at Hospital Clinic in Barcelona.

Ciaran Finn-Lynch 
In March 2010, Macchiarini attended a transplant performed by Great Ormond Street surgeons. Similar to the one done for Castillo, on a ten-year-old Irish boy, Ciaran Finn-Lynch, at Great Ormond Street Hospital in London. The boy was born with a 1 mm diameter trachea, and efforts to widen it had caused life-threatening complications. Unlike the Castillo procedure, in this case, the stripped trachea was seeded with the boy's stem cells just hours before it was implanted.

Keziah Shorten 
Keziah Shorten had trachea cancer. In 2010, Macchiarini performed a transplant similar to the earlier two; the transplant failed the next year, and a synthetic trachea was implanted for palliative care at University College Hospital London in 2011, after which she was able to be discharged and return home for Christmas with her family before succumbing to her underlying disease.

Woman in Russia
In 2010, Macchiarini implanted a seeded donated trachea in a woman in Russia, while working with surgeon Vladimir Parshin.

Andemariam Teklesenbet Beyene 
Andemariam Teklesenbet Beyene was a man from Eritrea who was earning a master's degree in Iceland when he was diagnosed with cancer; the cancer was treated with chemotherapy and surgery in 2009, but in 2011 his trachea was obstructed again. Beyene's doctors recommended palliative care, but also reached out to Macchiarini, who was at KI by that time. In this case, Macchiarini collaborated with scientists at University College London to manufacture a fully synthetic trachea, with an engineered scaffold seeded with Beyene's marrow cells, instead of using a donated and stripped trachea, as it had been done before. The operation occurred in June 2011 and was widely covered in the media, including a front page story in The New York Times. By end of the year the implant was failing, and while Beyene was able to complete his Ph.D in 2012, he died in January 2013 despite undergoing many treatments at KI. The autopsy showed that Beyene had a chronic lung infection, a clot in his lung, and the synthetic trachea had come loose.

Christopher Lyles 
Christopher Lyles lived in the United States; he had tracheal cancer which was treated with radiation and surgery. He heard about Beyene's treatment and through his doctor asked Macchiarini to do the same for him. Macchiarini obliged, creating a fully synthetic trachea seeded with stem cells from Lyles and implanting it at KI in November 2011. Lyles died suddenly in 2012 after he had returned home; no autopsy was performed.

Yulia Tuulik 
In June 2012, Macchiarini implanted a fully synthetic seeded trachea in Yulia Tuulik at Kuban State Medical University; Tuulik had a tracheostomy resulting from a car accident, but her life was not in danger. The graft included a cricoid cartilage, part of the voice box, which Macchiarini had not tried before. The trachea later collapsed, and was replaced; she died in 2014. An audit by the Russian government later found that Macchiarini had operated without a Russian medical license.

Alexander Zozulya
Also in June 2012, Macchiarini implanted a second synthetic seeded trachea on Alexander Zozulya, who also had a tracheostomy resulting from a car accident and whose life was not in danger. The effects from the first implant in 2012 prompted a second surgery in November 2013. Zozulya died in February 2014 under unclear circumstances.

Yesim Cetir 
Turkish national Yesim Cetir underwent a routine surgery in 2011 to treat excessive sweating in her hands, but due to an error her trachea was severely injured and her left lung was damaged. She came to Macchiarini at the KI for treatment, and in 2012 he first removed her left lung and replaced her trachea with a pipe, then replaced the pipe with a fully synthetic seeded trachea. The next year the implant collapsed and Macchiarini replaced it with a second one. Cetir had many complications from this procedure, remained in constant need of having her airway cleared, and suffered kidney failure. In 2016 she underwent multiple organ transplants in the U.S., and her trachea was replaced with one from a cadaver. Cetir died in March 2017.

Hannah Warren 
In April 2013, Macchiarini implanted a fully synthetic seeded trachea in two-year-old Hannah Warren, who had been born without one. The operation was performed at OSF Saint Francis Medical Center in Peoria, Illinois, United States. The operation also involved her esophagus, which did not heal properly and required a second operation in June; she died 6 July 2013, from complications of the second surgery.

Sadiq Kanaan 
In August 2013 Sadiq Kanaan received a fully synthetic seeded tracheal implant from Macchiarini at Kuban State Medical University. He died later the same year.

Dmitri Onogda 
In June 2014, Macchiarini implanted a fully synthetic seeded trachea in Dmitri Onogda at the Kuban State Medical University. The implant failed and was replaced, and as of 2017 Onogda was still alive.

Allegations

University Hospital Careggi patient extortion
In 2012, Macchiarini was arrested in Italy and charged with asking patients at AOUC for money to expedite their procedures; the charges were dismissed in May 2015 and the prosecutor's appeal was dismissed in September 2015.

Research misconduct
In 2014, Macchiarini was accused by four former colleagues and co-authors of having falsified claims in his research with KI. The following April, KI's ethics committee issued a response to one set of allegations with regard to research ethics and peer review at The Lancet, and found them to be groundless.

KI had also appointed an external expert, Bengt Gerdin, to review the charges, comparing the results reported to the medical record of the hospital; the report was released by the university in May 2015. Gerdin found that Macchiarini had committed research misconduct in seven papers by not getting ethical approval for the some of his operations, and misrepresenting the result of some of those operations, as well as work he had done in animals.

In August 2015, after considering the findings and a rebuttal provided by Macchiarini, KI vice-chancellor Anders Hamsten found that he had acted "without due care" but had not committed misconduct. The Lancet, which published Macchiarini's work, also published an article defending him.

On 13 January 2016, Gerdin criticized the vice-chancellor's dismissal of the allegations in an interview with Sveriges Television (SVT). Later that day, the SVT investigative program Dokument inifrån began broadcasting a three-part series, titled "Experimenten", in which Macchiarini's work was investigated. The documentary shows Macchiarini continuing operations with his new transplant method even after it showed little or no promise, exaggerating the health of his patients in articles as they died. While Macchiarini admitted that the synthetic trachea did not work in the current state, he did not agree that trying it on several additional patients without further testing had been inappropriate. Allegations were also made that patients' medical conditions both before and after the operations, as reported in academic papers, did not match reality. Macchiarini also stated that the synthetic trachea had been tested on animals before using it on humans, something that could not be verified.

On 28 January, KI issued a statement saying that the documentary made claims of which it was unaware, and that it would consider re-opening the investigations. These concerns were echoed by KI's chairman, Lars Leijonborg, and the chairman of the Swedish Medical Association, Heidi Stensmyren, calling for an independent investigation that would also look at how the issue was dealt with by the university and hospital management.

In February 2016, KI published a review of Macchiarini's CV that identified discrepancies. The university announced that it would not renew Macchiarini's research contract, which was due to expire in November, and the next month Karolinska terminated the contract.

In October 2016, the BBC broadcast a three-part Storyville documentary, Fatal Experiments: The Downfall of a Supersurgeon, directed by Bosse Lindquist and based on the earlier Swedish programmes about Macchiarini. After the special aired, KI requested Sweden's national scientific review board to review six of Macchiarini's publications about the procedures. The board published its findings in October 2017, and concluded that all six were the result of scientific misconduct, in particular by failing to report the complications and deaths that occurred after the interventions; one of the articles also claimed that the procedure had been approved by an ethics committee, when this had not happened. The board called for all six of the papers to be retracted. It also said that all of the co-authors had committed scientific misconduct as well.

Retractions
The following papers authored by Macchiarini have been retracted:
November 2012, retracted by the journal for copying a table from another paper without citing it:
 
March 2017, retracted by authors after Karolinska requested retraction in December 2016; after Nature had issued an editorial notice of concern in October 2016:

 Macchiarini's 2011 Lancet paper described the treatment of Beyene. In February 2016 the Royal Swedish Academy of Sciences called for the Lancet to correct the paper, as Beyene had died, in March 2016 four authors asked to be removed as authors, and in April 2016 the Lancet issued a notice of concern; this paper too has since been retracted.

Other misconduct 
A story published by Vanity Fair on 5 January 2016 discussed Macchiarini's affair with a journalist, who had written enthusiastic articles about him. The story also called into question statements he had made on his CV. The article paints him as a serial fabulist, and as "the extreme form of a con man", remarking that "the fact that he could keep all the details straight and compartmentalize these different lives and lies is really amazing." The article details a courtship and alleged subsequent marriage arrangements from the perspective of a NBC News producer, Benita Alexander. Alexander had been tasked by NBC News to produce a documentary-type programme for Dateline in 2013 called "A Leap of Faith" to portray Macchiarini and she ultimately began an affair with her subject, only to find out later in 2015 that he had been married for thirty years, including the entire period of the courtship. The details recounted in the article include Alexander relating Macchiarini's alleged lies about being a surgeon to the stars and current and former heads of state, and a planned wedding to Alexander to be the social event of the year (with Pope Francis officiating, Andrea Bocelli singing, Enoteca Pinchiorri catering, and numerous celebrities attending), among other reported falsified details about his C.V. and personal life.

Macchiarini is reported to have claimed that Pope Francis had given his personal blessing for the wedding between the couple, both said to be divorcees, and would host the ceremony. The Pope's spokesman said that the Pope had no "personal doctor" named Macchiarini, knew nobody of that name, and would not have officiated.

In August 2021, the third season of the Dr. Death podcast began publishing episodes consisting a six-episode season about Macchiarini, entitled "Miracle Man". The audio series covers the accusations of ethical misconduct and manipulation in Macchiarini's medical work alongside those of his personal deceit in his affair with Alexander, told through a series of interviews with the latter.

Fallout for Karolinska Institute 
The secretary of the Nobel Committee for Physiology or Medicine, Urban Lendahl, resigned in February 2016, owing to his involvement in recruiting Macchiarini to Karolinska Institutet in 2010. Shortly afterwards the vice chancellor, Anders Hamsten, who in 2015 had cleared Macchiarini of scientific misconduct, also resigned.

In August 2016, a committee led by Kjell Asplund that had been called into being in February to investigate the three operations that Macchiarini had performed at the Karolinska University Hospital issued its report, identifying several ethical shortcomings by the hospital and Macchiarini; it also noted the pressure put on the hospital by the institute with regard to Macchiarini's hospital appointment and translational research.

Another report was issued in early September that examined the behavior of the institute; it was authored by a committee led by Sten Heckscher. The report found that the institute had conducted almost no diligence in hiring Macchiarini nor in overseeing his work, nor in considering his performance in reviewing his contracts; the committee found that interference from people higher up in management had interfered in the processes.

On 5 September 2016, the Swedish government moved to dismiss the entire board of the Institute. Shortly afterwards Harriet Wallberg and Anders Hamsten were removed from the judging panel that is responsible for annually choosing the Nobel Prize for Medicine, selection of which is additionally overseen by Karolinska Institutet.

Criminal investigations and convictions 
In June 2016 Swedish police opened an investigation into whether Macchiarini might have committed involuntary manslaughter. In October 2017, the public prosecutor office announced that all criminal charges against Macchiarini have been dropped, although the medical treatment in four of five cases operated in Sweden was classified as 'negligent' the criminal responsibility cannot be proven. After a one-year medico-legal investigation, the attorney general's office announced in October 2017 that Macchiarini had been negligent in four of the five cases investigated due to the use of devices and procedures not supported by evidence, but that a crime could not be proven because the patients might have died under any other treatment given.

In 2019, an Italian court sentenced Macchiarini to sixteen months in prison for abuse of office and forging documents.

On 29 September 2020, Mikael Bjork, director of Public Prosecution in Sweden indicted an unnamed surgeon on charges of aggravated assault. Swedish news agency TT said the indicted surgeon was Paolo Macchiarini. Bjork said he reopened the investigation in December 2018 and obtained new written evidence and interviewed individuals in five different countries. Bjork said victims received "serious physical injuries and great suffering" as a result of the operations performed on them and that he "made the assessment that the three operations are therefore to be considered as aggravated assault." Macchiarini was convicted of causing bodily harm, but not assault. He received a suspended sentence on 16 June 2022.

See also 
 List of scientific misconduct incidents

References

External links 
Information Index: Trachea Transplants and Paolo Macchiarini, M.D. by Citizens for Responsible Care and Research, Inc.
Macchiarini posts at For Better Science
Macchiarini posts at Retraction Watch

1958 births
Year of birth uncertain
Living people
Confidence tricksters
Italian transplant surgeons
Academic staff of the Karolinska Institute
Physicians from Basel-Stadt
Regenerative biomedicine
People involved in scientific misconduct incidents
University of Pisa alumni
Medical scandals
Italian thoracic surgeons